Rinaldo Capuzzi (12 July 1904 – 1 March 1990) was an Italian sports shooter. He competed in the 50 m rifle event at the 1948 Summer Olympics.

References

External links
 

1904 births
1990 deaths
Italian male sport shooters
Olympic shooters of Italy
Shooters at the 1948 Summer Olympics
Sportspeople from Brescia